A quine is a computer program which takes no input and produces a copy of its own source code as its only output. The standard terms for these programs in the computability theory and computer science literature are "self-replicating programs", "self-reproducing programs", and "self-copying programs".

A quine is a fixed point of an execution environment, when the execution environment is viewed as a function transforming programs into their outputs. Quines are possible in any Turing-complete programming language, as a direct consequence of Kleene's recursion theorem. For amusement, programmers sometimes attempt to develop the shortest possible quine in any given programming language.

The name "quine" was coined by Douglas Hofstadter, in his popular science book Gödel, Escher, Bach, in honor of philosopher Willard Van Orman Quine (1908–2000), who made an extensive study of indirect self-reference, and in particular for the following paradox-producing expression, known as Quine's paradox:

"Yields falsehood when preceded by its quotation" yields falsehood when preceded by its quotation.

History
The idea of self-reproducing automata came from the dawn of computing, if not before. John von Neumann theorized about them in the 1940s. Later, Paul Bratley and Jean Millo's article "Computer Recreations: Self-Reproducing Automata" discussed them in 1972.
Bratley first became interested in self-reproducing programs after seeing the first known such program written in Atlas Autocode at Edinburgh in the 1960s by the University of Edinburgh lecturer and researcher Hamish Dewar.

The "download source" requirement of the Affero General Public License is based on the idea of a quine.

Examples

Constructive quines
In general, the method used to create a quine in any programming language is to have, within the program, two pieces: (a) code used to do the actual printing and (b) data that represents the textual form of the code.  The code functions by using the data to print the code (which makes sense since the data represents the textual form of the code), but it also uses the data, processed in a simple way, to print the textual representation of the data itself.

Here are three small examples in Python 3:
# Example A. chr(39) == "'".
a = 'a = {}{}{}; print(a.format(chr(39), a, chr(39)))'; print(a.format(chr(39), a, chr(39)))
# Example B. chr(39) == "'".
b = 'b = %s%s%s; print(b %% (chr(39), b, chr(39)))'; print(b % (chr(39), b, chr(39)))
# Example C. %r will quote automatically.
c = 'c = %r; print(c %% c)'; print(c % c)

The following Java code demonstrates the basic structure of a quine.
public class Quine
{
  public static void main(String[] args)
  {
    char q = 34;      // Quotation mark character
    String[] l = {    // Array of source code
    "public class Quine",
    "{",
    "  public static void main(String[] args)",
    "  {",
    "    char q = 34;      // Quotation mark character",
    "    String[] l = {    // Array of source code",
    "    ",
    "    };",
    "    for (int i = 0; i < 6; i++)           // Print opening code",
    "        System.out.println(l[i]);",
    "    for (int i = 0; i < l.length; i++)    // Print string array",
    "        System.out.println(l[6] + q + l[i] + q + ',');",
    "    for (int i = 7; i < l.length; i++)    // Print this code",
    "        System.out.println(l[i]);",
    "  }",
    "}",
    };
    for (int i = 0; i < 6; i++)           // Print opening code
        System.out.println(l[i]);
    for (int i = 0; i < l.length; i++)    // Print string array
        System.out.println(l[6] + q + l[i] + q + ',');
    for (int i = 7; i < l.length; i++)    // Print this code
        System.out.println(l[i]);
  }
}
The source code contains a string array of itself, which is output twice, once inside quotation marks.

This code was adapted from an original post from c2.com, where the author, Jason Wilson, posted it as a minimalistic version of a Quine, without Java comments.

Thanks to new text blocks feature in Java 15 (or newer), a more readable and simpler version is possible:

public class Quine {
	public static void main(String[] args) {
		String textBlockQuotes = new String(new char[]{'"', '"', '"'});
		char newLine = 10;
		String source = """
public class Quine {
	public static void main(String[] args) {
		String textBlockQuotes = new String(new char[]{'"', '"', '"'});
		char newLine = 10;
		String source = %s;
		System.out.print(source.formatted(textBlockQuotes + newLine + source + textBlockQuotes));
	}
}
""";
		System.out.print(source.formatted(textBlockQuotes + newLine + source + textBlockQuotes));
	}
}

Eval quines

Some programming languages have the ability to evaluate a string as a program. Quines can take advantage of this feature.  For example, this Ruby quine:

eval s="print 'eval s=';p s"

Lua can do:
s="print(string.format('s=%c%s%c; load(s)()',34,s,34))"; load(s)()

In Python 3.8:
exec(s:='print("exec(s:=%r)"%s)')

"Cheating" quines

Self-evaluation 
In many functional languages, including Scheme and other Lisps, and interactive languages such as APL, numbers are self-evaluating.  In TI-BASIC, if the last line of a program returns a value, the returned value is displayed on the screen. Therefore, in such languages a program consisting of only a single digit results in a 1-byte quine.  Since such code does not construct itself, this is often considered cheating.

1

In some languages, particularly scripting languages but also C, an empty source file is a fixed point of the language, being a valid program that produces no output. Such an empty program, submitted as "the world's smallest self reproducing program", once won the "worst abuse of the rules" prize in the International Obfuscated C Code Contest. The program was not actually compiled, but used cp to copy the file into another file, which could be executed to print nothing.

Other questionable techniques include making use of compiler messages; for example, in the GW-BASIC environment, entering "Syntax Error" will cause the interpreter to respond with "Syntax Error".

Source code inspection 
Quines, per definition, cannot receive any form of input, including reading a file, which means a quine is considered to be "cheating" if it looks at its own source code. The following shell script is not a quine:
#!/bin/sh
# Invalid quine.
# Reading the executed file from disk is cheating.
cat $0

A shorter variant, exploiting the behaviour of shebang directives:
#!/bin/cat

Ouroboros programs
The quine concept can be extended to multiple levels of recursion, giving rise to  "ouroboros programs", or quine-relays. This should not be confused with multiquines.

Example
This Java program outputs the source for a C++ program that outputs the original Java code.

#include <iostream>
#include <string>
using namespace std;

int main(int argc, char* argv[])
{
    char q = 34;
    string l[] = {
    "    ",
    "=============<<<<<<<< C++ Code >>>>>>>>=============",
    "#include <iostream>",
    "#include <string>",
    "using namespace std;",
    "",
    "int main(int argc, char* argv[])",
    "{",
    "    char q = 34;",
    "    string l[] = {",
    "    };",
    "    for(int i = 20; i <= 25; i++)",
    "        cout << l[i] << endl;",
    "    for(int i = 0; i <= 34; i++)",
    "        cout << l[0] + q + l[i] + q + ',' << endl;",
    "    for(int i = 26; i <= 34; i++)",
    "        cout << l[i] << endl;",
    "    return 0;",
    "}",
    "=============<<<<<<<< Java Code >>>>>>>>=============",
    "public class Quine",
    "{",
    "  public static void main(String[] args)",
    "  {",
    "    char q = 34;",
    "    String[] l = {",
    "    };",
    "    for(int i = 2; i <= 9; i++)",
    "        System.out.println(l[i]);",
    "    for(int i = 0; i < l.length; i++)",
    "        System.out.println(l[0] + q + l[i] + q + ',');",
    "    for(int i = 10; i <= 18; i++)",
    "        System.out.println(l[i]);",
    "  }",
    "}",
    };
    for(int i = 20; i <= 25; i++)
        cout << l[i] << endl;
    for(int i = 0; i <= 34; i++)
        cout << l[0] + q + l[i] + q + ',' << endl;
    for(int i = 26; i <= 34; i++)
        cout << l[i] << endl;
    return 0;
}public class Quine
{
  public static void main(String[] args)
  {
    char q = 34;
    String[] l = {
    "    ",
    "=============<<<<<<<< C++ Code >>>>>>>>=============",
    "#include <iostream>",
    "#include <string>",
    "using namespace std;",
    "",
    "int main(int argc, char* argv[])",
    "{",
    "    char q = 34;",
    "    string l[] = {",
    "    };",
    "    for(int i = 20; i <= 25; i++)",
    "        cout << l[i] << endl;",
    "    for(int i = 0; i <= 34; i++)",
    "        cout << l[0] + q + l[i] + q + ',' << endl;",
    "    for(int i = 26; i <= 34; i++)",
    "        cout << l[i] << endl;",
    "    return 0;",
    "}",
    "=============<<<<<<<< Java Code >>>>>>>>=============",
    "public class Quine",
    "{",
    "  public static void main(String[] args)",
    "  {",
    "    char q = 34;",
    "    String[] l = {",
    "    };",
    "    for(int i = 2; i <= 9; i++)",
    "        System.out.println(l[i]);",
    "    for(int i = 0; i < l.length; i++)",
    "        System.out.println(l[0] + q + l[i] + q + ',');",
    "    for(int i = 10; i <= 18; i++)",
    "        System.out.println(l[i]);",
    "  }",
    "}",
    };
    for(int i = 2; i <= 9; i++)
        System.out.println(l[i]);
    for(int i = 0; i < l.length; i++)
        System.out.println(l[0] + q + l[i] + q + ',');
    for(int i = 10; i <= 18; i++)
        System.out.println(l[i]);
  }
}

Such programs have been produced with various cycle lengths:

 Haskell → Python → Ruby
 Python → Bash → Perl
 C → Haskell → Python → Perl
 Haskell → Perl → Python → Ruby → C → Java
 Ruby → Java → C# → Python
 C → C++ → Ruby → Python → PHP → Perl
 Ruby → Python → Perl → Lua → OCaml → Haskell → C → Java → Brainfuck → Whitespace → Unlambda
 Ruby → Scala → Scheme → Scilab → Shell (bash) → S-Lang → Smalltalk → Squirrel3 → Standard ML → ... → Rexx (128 (and formerly 50) programming languages)
 Web application → C (web application source code consists of HTML, JavaScript, and CSS)

Multiquines

David Madore, creator of Unlambda, describes multiquines as follows:

"A multiquine is a set of r different programs (in r different languages – without this condition we could take them all equal to a single quine), each of which is able to print any of the r programs (including itself) according to the command line argument it is passed. (Cheating is not allowed: the command line arguments must not be too long – passing the full text of a program is considered cheating)."

A multiquine consisting of 2 languages (or biquine) would be a program which:
 When run, is a quine in language X. 
 When supplied with a user-defined command line argument, would print a second program in language Y. 
 Given the second program in language Y, when run normally, would also be a quine in language Y.
 Given the second program in language Y, and supplied with a user-defined command line argument, would produce the original program in language X.

A biquine could then be seen as a set of two programs, both of which are able to print either of the two, depending on the command line argument supplied.

Theoretically, there is no limit on the number of languages in a multiquine.
A 5-part multiquine (or pentaquine) has been produced with Python, Perl, C, NewLISP, and F#
and there is also a 25-language multiquine.

Polyglot

Similar to, but unlike a multiquine, a polyglot program is a computer program or script written in a valid form of multiple programming languages or file formats by combining their syntax. A polyglot program is not required to have a self-reproducing quality, although a polyglot program can also be a quine in one or more of its possible ways to execute.

Unlike quines and multiquines, polyglot programs are not guaranteed to exist between arbitrary sets of languages as a result of Kleene's recursion theorem, because they rely on the interplay between the syntaxes, and not a provable property that one can always be embedded within another.

Radiation-hardened
A radiation-hardened quine is a quine that can have any single character removed and still produces the original program with no missing character.  Of necessity, such quines are much more convoluted than ordinary quines, as is seen by the following example in Ruby:

eval='eval$q=%q(puts %q(10210/#{1 1 if 1==21}}/.i rescue##/

1 1"[13,213].max_by{|s|s.size}#"##").gsub(/\d/){["=\47eval$q=%q(#$q)#\47##\47

",:eval,:instance_,"||=9"][eval$&]}
exit)#'##'

instance_eval='eval$q=%q(puts %q(10210/#{1 1 if 1==21}}/.i rescue##/

1 1"[13,213].max_by{|s|s.size}#"##").gsub(/\d/){["=\47eval$q=%q(#$q)#\47##\47

",:eval,:instance_,"||=9"][eval$&]}
exit)#'##'

/#{eval eval if eval==instance_eval}}/.i rescue##/

eval eval"[eval||=9,instance_eval||=9].max_by{|s|s.size}#"##"

See also

Diagonal lemma
Droste effect
Fixed point combinator
Self-modifying code
Self-interpreter
Self-replicating machine
Self-replication
Self-relocation
TiddlyWiki
Tupper's self-referential formula
Programming languages
Quine's paradox
Polyglot (computing)

Notes

References

Further reading
Douglas Hofstadter: Gödel, Escher, Bach: An Eternal Golden Braid
Ken Thompson: "Reflections on Trusting Trust" (Communications of the ACM, 27(8):761-3)

External links

TiddlyWiki, a quine manifested as a wiki
The Quine Page (by Gary P. Thompson)
A Brief Guide to Self-Referential Programs
QuineProgram at the Portland Pattern Repository Wiki
David Madore's Discussion of Quines
Zip File Quine
Zip Files All The Way Down
An Introduction to Quines — in particular, quines using more than one language
Quine Web Page: A standards-conforming HTML+JavaScript web page that shows its own source code
HTML Quine: An HTML page that only uses HTML and CSS to show its own source code
Quine Challenge for Tom's JavaScript Machine, with a series of interactive hints
A Java Quine built straight from Kleene's fixed point theorem, composition and s-n-m
A QR code quine

Source code
Articles with example C code
Willard Van Orman Quine
Test items in computer languages
Computer programming folklore
Self-replication